The Hietaniemi cemetery is located mainly in the Lapinlahti quarter and partly in the Etu-Töölö district of Helsinki, the capital of Finland. It is the location for Finnish state funeral services and is owned by the
Evangelical Lutheran Church of Finland.

The cemetery includes a large military cemetery section for soldiers from the capital fallen in the wars against the Soviet Union and Nazi Germany: in the Winter War (1939–1940), the Continuation War (1941–1944) and the Lapland War (1944–1945). In the centre of the military cemetery are the tombs of the unknown soldier and Marshal C. G. E. Mannerheim. Other notable sections of the cemetery are the cemetery of the Finnish Guard, the Artist's Hill and the Statesmen's Grove. There are two Lutheran funerary chapels and a crematorium at the area.

Hietaniemi means "sand cape" and is a headland located centrally in Helsinki.

Description
The cemetery is partly located at a promontory, and partly directly adjacent to the Hietaniemi Beach.

The cemetery is a popular tourist attraction, especially amongst Finns visiting the graves of relatives fallen in wars or the graves of the many famous Finns buried there since the 1820s. 

Four other cemeteries are also located at the greater cemetery district of Hietaniemi: the Helsinki Jewish cemetery, the Helsinki Islamic cemetery, the Helsinki Orthodox cemetery and the cemetery of the St. Nicholas Orthodox Parish.

In the 2010s, it was confirmed that an extensive catacomb network was located beneath the Orthodox cemetery.

Notable interments

 Carl Ludvig Engel (July 3, 1778, Charlottenburg – May 4, 1840, Helsinki)
 Georg August Wallin (October 24, 1811, Sund – October 23, 1852)
 Zachris Topelius (January 14, 1818, Kuddnäs – March 12, 1898, Sipoo)
 Fredrik Pacius (March 19, 1809, Hamburg – January 8, 1901, Helsinki)
 Lorenz Leonard Lindelöf (November 13, 1827, Karvia – March 3, 1908, Helsinki)
 Paavo Cajander (December 24, 1846, Hämeenlinna – June 14, 1913, Helsinki)
 Janis Rozentāls (March 18, 1866, Saldus parish – December 26, 1916, Helsinki)
 Verna Erikson (1893–1918)
 Toivo Kuula (July 7, 1883 – May 18, 1918)
 Oskar Merikanto (August 5, 1868, Helsinki – February 17, 1924)
 Usko Nyström (September 8, 1861, Virrat – January 6, 1925, Kotka)
 I. K. Inha (November 12, 1865 Virrat – April 3, 1930, Helsinki)
 Artur Sirk (September 25, 1900, Pruuna – August 2, 1937, Echternach)
 Lauri Kristian Relander (May 31, 1883, Kurkijoki – February 9, 1942, Helsinki), 2nd President of the Republic Finland
 Leevi Madetoja (17 February 1887, Oulu – 6 October 1947, Helsinki)
 Eemil Halonen (May 21, 1875, Lapinlahti – November 5, 1950, Helsinki)
 Carl Gustaf Emil Mannerheim (June 4, 1867, Askainen – January 27, 1951, Lausanne), 6th President of the Republic Finland
 Kaarlo Juho Ståhlberg (January 28, 1865, Suomussalmi – September 22, 1952, Helsinki), 1st President of the Republic Finland
 Risto Ryti (February 3, 1889, Huittinen – October 25, 1956, Helsinki), 5th President of the Republic Finland
 Juho Kusti Paasikivi (November 27, 1870, Koski Hl – December 14, 1956, Helsinki), 7th President of the Republic Finland
 Viktor Jansson (1886, Helsinki – 1958, Helsinki)
 Aarre Merikanto (June 29, 1893, Helsinki – September 28, 1958, Helsinki)
 Michael Schilkin (May 1, 1900, Trubino – May 3, 1962)
 Anna Vyrubova (July 16, 1884, Oranienbaum – July 20, 1964, Helsinki)
 Väinö Tanner (March 12, 1881, Helsinki - April 19, 1966, Helsinki), 10th Prime minister of the Republic of Finland
 Kalervo Kallio (March 28, 1909, Nivala – November 2, 1969, Helsinki)
 Aladár Paasonen (December 11, 1898, Budapest – July 6, 1974, Flourtown)
 Alvar Aalto (February 3, 1898, Kuortane – May 11, 1976, Helsinki)
 Erik von Frenckell (November 18, 1887, Helsinki – September 13, 1977, Espoo)
 Karl Lennart Oesch (August 8, 1892, Pyhäjärvi – March 28, 1978, Helsinki)
 Mika Waltari (September 19, 1908, Helsinki – August 26, 1979, Helsinki)
 Urho Kekkonen (September 3, 1900, Pielavesi – August 31, 1986, Helsinki), 8th President of the Republic Finland
 Henry Theel (November 14, 1917, Helsinki – December 19, 1989)
 Gustaf Magnusson (December 8, 1902, Ylitornio – December 27, 1993, Helsinki)
 Elissa Aalto (November 22, 1922, Kemi – April 12, 1994, Helsinki)
 Petri Walli (February 25, 1969, Finland – June 28, 1995, Helsinki)
 Heimo Haitto (May 22, 1925, Ruokolahti – June 9, 1999, Marbella)
 Jack Witikka (December 20, 1916, Helsinki – January 28, 2002, Helsinki)
 Adolf Ehrnrooth (February 9, 1905, Helsinki – February 26, 2004, Turku)
 Erik Bergman (November 24, 1911, Nykarleby – April 24, 2006, Helsinki)
 Timo Sarpaneva (October 31, 1926, Helsinki – October 6, 2006, Helsinki)
 Tony Halme January 6, 1963, Helsinki – January 8, 2010, Helsinki)
 Ukri Merikanto (March 30, 1950 – July 25, 2010)
 Anita Välkki (October 25, 1926, Sääksmäki – April 27, 2011, Helsinki)
 Paavo Berglund (April 14, 1929, Helsinki – January 25, 2012, Helsinki)
 Mauno Koivisto (November 25, 1923, Turku – May 12, 2017, Helsinki), 9th President of the Republic Finland

See also
Malmi Cemetery
List of burials at Hietaniemi Cemetery
List of national cemeteries

References

External links 

 Hietaniemi cemetery 
 Hietaniemi cemetery at Find a Grave
 * 

National cemeteries
Buildings and structures in Helsinki
Cemeteries in Finland
Lutheran cemeteries
Tourist attractions in Helsinki
Töölö
Länsisatama